The Ultimate Coyote Ugly Search is an American reality television competition broadcast by Country Music Television. The first two seasons saw a group of 'wannabes' paired with a serving Coyote in the hope of getting a job at the Coyote Ugly Saloon and a cash sum for them and their partner. The final season changed the format. In the final season, singing-dancing female bartenders competed for a position with the company's traveling troupe and a $50,000 prize.

Season Three 
Season three, which premiered March 7, 2008, featured 10 contestants. They are listed below in alphabetical order according to name, occupation, and hometown.

Ashley Glasgow, Entrepreneur, Tampa, Florida
Jessica Henry, Singer/Actress, Philadelphia, Pennsylvania
Jocelyn Towle, Insurance Processor, Miami, Florida
Kelly Bentley, Former National Guard member, Ashland, Alabama
Lauren Lee, Bartender, Nashville, Tennessee
Sarah LeClear, Dancer, Los Angeles, California
Tanea Renee Singleton, Singer, New York City, New York
Taylin Rae, Singer, Oklahoma City, Oklahoma
Tiffany Mallari, Dancer, San Francisco, California
Tracy Hanna, nightclub Promoter, Ridgefield, New Jersey

Season 3 Contestant Progress

 The contestant was declared the winner. 
 The contestant finished in second place.
 The contestant finished in third place.
 The contestant won belt number one, and was declared the best of the week.
 The contestant was in the top, but was not declared the best. 
 The contestant was one of the worst, but was not in the bottom two. 
 The contestant was in the bottom two. 
 The contestant was eliminated.

Lauren and Taylin were the original bottom two in week three, with Lil opting to send Taylin home. However, although she was in the top, Tanea decided to leave the competition, thus allowing Taylin to stay.
In week seven, Lil did not announce a winner, nor was there a bottom two, as she only announced if the contestants would advance to the finale or not.

Previous seasons 

In 2006, "The Ultimate Coyote Ugly Search" became a reality TV show on CMT. The premise of the show is that Lovell is auditioning girls to become the next "coyote". With the help from a few of her "coyote mentors", Lil trains girls to become bartenders, dancers, and all around entertainers, and one will prevail to become a regular coyote and win $25,000.

In 2007, the series reappeared on CMT. This time around, the series was based on teams. Lil chose five of her best Coyotes from bars across the country. Each of those coyotes would then hold auditions at their home bars to find teammates for the competition. The teams for the competition were:

The team that won this competition was Team New York, who was rewarded $50,000.

References 

2006 American television series debuts
2007 American television series endings
2000s American reality television series
CMT (American TV channel) original programming